"Playing with Fire" is a song by Swedish singer Liam Cacatian Thomassen, winner of the Swedish version of Idol in its twelve season in 2016. The song was released as a digital download in Sweden on 10 December 2016 through Universal Music Group. The song is written by Rasmus Hedegaard, Alexander Tidebrink, Calle Lehmann and also the group Vigiland. The song has peaked at number 4 on the Swedish Singles Chart.

Track listing

Chart performance

Weekly charts

Release history

References

2016 debut singles
2016 songs
Universal Music Group singles
Songs written by Hedegaard (DJ)
Songs written by A7S